Juan Pablo Ángel Arango (born 24 October 1975) is a Colombian former footballer who last played as a striker for Atlético Nacional in Categoría Primera A.

He began his career at Nacional, whom he helped to win the championship in 1994, and then moved to River Plate of Argentina, where he was the league's top scorer in 2000. The following year he moved to Europe, joining Aston Villa of the Premier League for a club record £9.5 million. In 2007, he moved to the United States, where he played for three clubs in Major League Soccer before returning to Atlético Nacional in 2013.

Ángel was also a full international for Colombia, and made 33 appearances from his debut in 1995, scoring 9 goals.

Ángel is the father of footballer Tomás Ángel, who currently plays as a forward for Atlético Nacional.

Career

Atlético Nacional and River Plate
Ángel started playing professional football at Atlético Nacional in his home city of Medellín. Ángel began to make a name for himself when he scored the winning goal against local rival Independiente Medellín to help Nacional capture the 1994 Colombian title. During his time with his hometown club Ángel would appear in 147 league matches scoring 45 goals.

Ángel was sold to River Plate in Argentina in January 1998 as a replacement of the departed Hernán Crespo. River Plate spectators would often adorn angel wings to show their appreciation. During his time with the club, Ángel managed 62 goals in 132 games, including 16 goals in 25 Copa Libertadores matches.

Aston Villa
Ángel signed for Premier League side Aston Villa on 12 January 2001, becoming the club's record signing at £9.5 million. Angel made his debut away to Manchester United in a 0–2 loss on 20 January 2001. In his time at Villa, he was reportedly Villa's highest earner. After an indifferent start to his Aston Villa career, and family difficulties, Ángel settled down and started to reproduce the form that had persuaded chairman Doug Ellis to spend the large transfer fee. He quickly became a fans favourite and is the 3rd most recent Villa player to have scored more than 20 goals in one season (behind Christian Benteke in the 2012–13 season and Tammy Abraham in the 2018–19 season), finishing as the club's top scorer in the 2003–04 season with 16 goals in the FA Premier League, (23 goals including cup competitions) but could not maintain that form as Villa struggled and he only managed seven goals in 2004–05. That season he also missed two penalties in one game against Fulham. During his time with the club, Ángel managed 62 goals in 205 games across all competitions. Only two players have scored more goals for Villa in the Premier League era, those being Dwight Yorke (97 goals in 288 games) and Gabriel Agbonlahor (74 goals in 284 games).

New York Red Bulls
On 17 April 2007, the New York Red Bulls announced the signing of Ángel as their second designated player, pending the approval of his work visa. After his visa was approved, Ángel made his Red Bull debut 8 May 2007 in a US Open Cup qualifying match. Ángel came on as a substitute and scored from a free kick in extra time during the Red Bulls' 3–1 loss to Los Angeles Galaxy.  
 
Ángel also recorded an assist and played an important role in a third goal to round off a performance that earned him that week's MLS Player of the Week award. His form showed no signs of letting up in the following game, as he weighed in with two goals and another assist as the Red Bulls overcame Chicago Fire to win 3–0, taking them to joint top of the Eastern Conference.

Ángel was voted MLS Player of the Month for May 2007. He became the first Red Bull player to score in six straight games.

On 18 August 2007, Ángel added two more goals to his tally. His team defeated Los Angeles Galaxy 5–4. Ángel scored the first goal early on from a free kick before striking a late winner to seal the game for the Red Bulls.  Ángel also scored the first goal of the 2007 MLS All-Star Game on 19 July 2007 against Celtic, and later was named MVP of the Match for his performance. On 29 September 2007, Ángel scored a penalty to tie the Red Bulls' game against Real Salt Lake and in doing so scored his 17th goal of the season in all competitions, setting a new franchise record. Ángel concluded his initial campaign in New York scoring 19 goals and 5 assists in 24 league matches (20 goals in 27 matches in all official competitions). His regular season goal total was one short of Luciano Emilio who led the league with 20 but who had also played more games.

Ángel had a slow start to the 2008 season due to an arthritic nerve-related injury in his lower back that caused him to have pain in his hamstring but he finally scored his first of the season in his fourth appearance – a 2–1 winner against LA Galaxy on 10 May. On 5 June he fought through a still painful injury to score the only goal in New York's home win against Chivas USA. However, in doing so he also picked up another slight hamstring strain and after the final whistle he was seen limping off the pitch. As a result of this injury Ángel missed the Red Bulls' next 4 league games. Even through this injury-plagued season, his three goals were enough for coach Steve Nicol to name him to the 2008 MLS All-Star Game vs West Ham United in which he fed the pass that earned the game winning penalty kick and also scored a goal that was disallowed due to a controversial offside. Ángel concluded his second season in New York scoring 14 goals in 23 league matches (16 goals in 28 matches in official competitions).

Ángel's third season in New York was a major disappointment as the club had one of the worst seasons in club history. The club was quickly eliminated from play-off contention and failed to qualify to the group stages of the CONCACAF Champions League. However, Ángel still had his moments during the campaign as he became the club's all-time leading goal scorer. On 26 September 2009 he scored the equalising goal in a 1–1 draw at Chivas USA, that goal being the 46th of his career with New York and breaking Clint Mathis former record of 45. Ángel ended his season leading the club in scoring for the third straight year scoring 12 goals in 25 league matches.

Juan Pablo Ángel's 2010 season was greatly improved. He started off slow but slowly progressed during the first half of the season to claim a total of 11 goals from 19 games. He slumped in the second half of the season but concluded the season as the club's top scorer with 13 goals in 30 regular season appearances.  On 2 June 2010, Angel scored the game-winning goal in a match against the Houston Dynamo, snapping a four-game losing streak. On 21 October 2010 Ángel assisted Dane Richards on the opening goal in a 2–0 victory over New England Revolution which helped New York clinch its second ever regular season Eastern Conference title.

On 11 November 2010 it was announced that he would not be returning to the Red Bulls for the 2011 Major League Soccer season. Ángel trails only Bradley Wright Phillips in the club's all-time leading goal record, with 62.

Play-offs
On 26 October 2007, Ángel told the New York Daily News, "It's very American, in every sport the playoff system ... I think there should be more credit to the guys who do well in the regular season. It's interesting. It's a little bit unfair. I'm trying to understand it. I might answer you in a different way in a couple of weeks." A week later, Ángel and the Red Bulls were knocked out of contention for the 2007 MLS Cup by the New England Revolution on a 1–0 aggregate score as Ángel pleaded to his manager to be brought back on after coming off for treatment to a head injury received during the match which turned out to be a concussion.

The following season Ángel would help lead the Red Bulls to their first ever MLS Cup final. On the way they defeated Houston Dynamo 3–0 (4–1 aggregate) and Real Salt Lake 1–0, but ultimately lost the final to Columbus Crew 3–1. After a poor 2009 season the Red Bulls failed to qualify for the post season for the first time since Ángel's arrival.

The New York Red Bulls qualified the next season for the playoffs, with Ángel doing extremely well during the regular season. They ended up losing in the first round of the playoffs, losing 3–2 on aggregate, where Ángel scored a late goal to make the intense game 2–1 (2–2 aggregate) but Chris Wondolowski scored an even later goal to win it.

Los Angeles Galaxy
After the 2010 MLS season New York declined Ángel's contract option and Ángel elected to participate in the 2010 MLS Re-Entry Draft. On 15 December 2010 Ángel was selected by Los Angeles Galaxy in Stage 2 of the Re-Entry draft. On 19 January 2011 the club announced that they had signed Ángel to a multi-year contract which would make him the Galaxy's third designated player. He scored his first goal of his 2011 Galaxy campaign in a 4–1 loss against Real Salt Lake.

Chivas USA
On 17 August 2011, Ángel was traded to Chivas USA to make room for new Los Angeles designated player Robbie Keane. Ángel scored his first goal for 'the Goats' in his debut against the Colorado Rapids. Returning to form, he would go on to finish the 2011 season with 7 goals in just 9 games.

Ángel remained with Chivas USA through the 2012 season. His contract expired after 2012 and he made himself eligible for the 2012 MLS Re-Entry Draft in December 2012. Ángel became a free agent after he went undrafted in both rounds.

Atlético Nacional
Ángel's career came full circle in January 2013 when he signed a one-year contract to play for and captain his first club, Atlético Nacional. He arrived as a reinforcement to try and solve the club's goalscoring troubles under coach Juan Carlos Osorio, who was also responsible for bringing Ángel to New York. As a sign of commitment to the team, his wage in Medellín was only 30 million pesos (US$15,600) per month compared to his former salary in the US which was 300 million pesos (US$156,000) a month.

On 2 February 2013 Ángel wore green again as a starter at the Estadio Atanasio Girardot where he scored a goal from the penalty spot in his team's 3–0 victory against Atlético Huila. His second debut for the club would prove an ominous sign as the striker's return led to a dominant spell for Nacional. Ángel finished as his team's top goalscorer in the 2013 Apertura campaign as he helped fire them to the league title – the first of three consecutive championships (later adding the 2013 Clausura and 2014 Apertura), becoming the first club to achieve this since the Colombian league switched to the Apertura/Clausura format in 2002.

In addition to helping 'Los Verdolagas' return to league success, Ángel also lifted the 2013 Copa Colombia and helped his side reach the final of the Copa Sudamericana in 2014. He would play in the second leg of Nacional's losing effort in the Sudamericana final against former club River Plate on 10 December 2014. Of the game, he said: “I am closing my career in a final with the two clubs I love the most. I am overjoyed because that will be the last image that stays with me from football. I have lots of conflicting feelings; it is a wonderful way to end my career, as good as it gets.”
 Three days later, he made the final appearance of his career, coming on in the 72nd minute of a 1–0 loss to Santa Fe.

Career statistics
Source:

International goals
Scores and results list Colombia's goal tally first.

Honours

Club
Atlético Nacional
Categoría Primera A (4): 1994, 2013-I, 2013-II, 2014-I
Copa Interamericana (1): 1995
Copa Colombia (1): 2013
Club Atlético River Plate
Primera División Argentina (2): Apertura 1999, Clausura 2000
Aston Villa
UEFA Intertoto Cup (1): 2001
New York Red Bulls
MLS Western Conference (Playoffs) (1): 2008

Individual
MLS Player of the Month: May 2007, June 2007, October 2008
MLS Best XI: 2007

References

External links
 
 
 Argentine League Statistics at Fútbol XXI 

1975 births
Living people
Footballers from Medellín
Association football forwards
Colombian footballers
Colombia international footballers
Colombian expatriate footballers
Expatriate footballers in Argentina
Expatriate footballers in England
Expatriate soccer players in the United States
Major League Soccer All-Stars
Atlético Nacional footballers
Club Atlético River Plate footballers
Aston Villa F.C. players
New York Red Bulls players
LA Galaxy players
Argentine Primera División players
Premier League players
Major League Soccer players
Categoría Primera A players
Chivas USA players
Designated Players (MLS)